Light in Extension is a compilation album by American composer Bill Laswell, issued under the moniker Divination. Released in January 1994 by 4th & B'way Records, it comprises Vol. 1 and Vol. 2 of the Ambient Dub series in addition to two previously unreleased pieces.

Track listing

Personnel 
Adapted from the Light in Extension liner notes.

Jeff Bova – instruments (Vol. I & II)
Buckethead – instruments (Vol. I)
Mick Harris – instruments (Vol. II)
Bill Laswell – instruments and producer (Vol. I & II)
Robert Musso – instruments (Vol. I & II)
Nicky Skopelitis – instruments (Vol. I)
Liu Sola – instruments (Vol. I)
Jah Wobble – instruments (Vol. II)
Howie Weinberg – mastering

Release history

References

External links 
 Light in Extension at Discogs (list of releases)
 Light in Extension at Bandcamp

1994 compilation albums
Bill Laswell compilation albums
4th & B'way Records compilation albums
Albums produced by Bill Laswell